Jonathan Douglas Evans, Baron Evans of Weardale,  (born 1958) is a British life peer who formerly served as the Director General of the British Security Service, the United Kingdom's domestic security and counter-intelligence service. He took over the role on the retirement of his predecessor Dame Eliza Manningham-Buller on 21 April 2007. Evans was succeeded by Andrew Parker on 22 April 2013.

Early life
Evans was educated at Sevenoaks School and Bristol University where he read classical studies.

Career at MI5
Evans joined the Security Service in 1980, and initially worked in counter espionage. In 1985 he moved to the protective security function, dealing with internal and personnel security, before switching to domestic counter-terrorism in the late 1980s. For more than a decade he was involved with the effort to combat the domestic threat of groups such as the Provisional IRA during The Troubles. In 1999, with the violence in Northern Ireland greatly reduced due to the Good Friday Agreement, Evans moved to G-Branch, the section of MI5 which deals with international terrorism.  There he became an expert on al-Qaeda and other branches of Islamic terrorism.  He rose to head the section in 2001 (only a few days before the September 11, 2001 attacks), a position which put him on the service's board of management. In 2005, he became Deputy Director General before being promoted to head the organisation in 2007.

In November 2007, Evans talked publicly about the threat the UK faces from digital espionage.  He spoke at RUSI on National Security in February 2008. He has a Certificate in Company Direction from the Institute of Directors. In July 2010, the government revealed Evans received an annual salary of £159,999. In September 2010, Evans said that Anwar al-Awlaki was the West's Public Enemy No 1. Al-Awlaki was killed by a U.S. drone strike on 30 September 2011.

Evans was appointed Knight Commander of the Order of the Bath (KCB) in the 2013 New Year Honours for services to defence. Evans was succeeded by Andrew Parker on 22 April 2013.

Life peer, fellowships and directorships
After retiring as Director General, Evans joined the Board of HSBC Holdings as a Non-Executive Director. He is also a non-executive director of Ark Data Centres, a Distinguished Fellow at the Royal United Services Institute and an Honorary Professor at the University of St Andrews. From 2014 to 2015 he was a non-executive director of the National Crime Agency. He has written occasionally in the Sunday Times on classic cars.

On 21 October 2014, it was announced that he was to become a Crossbench life peer, having been nominated personally by the Prime Minister. He was created Baron Evans of Weardale, of Toys Hill in the County of Kent, on 3 December 2014. In January 2015 he was appointed a Deputy Lieutenant of Kent. and on 1 November 2018 he was appointed Chair of the Committee on Standards in Public Life for a 5-year term. In December 2018, following controversy about his paid business portfolio in light of his appointment to the committee, it was announced that he would step down from his position as a Non-Executive Director with HSBC Holdings in early 2019.

References

External links
Biography

1958 births
Living people
Directors General of MI5
Knights Commander of the Order of the Bath
Alumni of the University of Bristol
People educated at Sevenoaks School
Crossbench life peers
Deputy Lieutenants of Kent
Member of the Committee on Standards in Public Life
Life peers created by Elizabeth II